The Newark Portuguese were an American soccer club based in Newark, New Jersey that was a member of the American Soccer League. The club had been around since 1922 and bought out the Kearny Celtic franchise after the 1950/51 season. The club won the Lewis Cup in 1953.

Newark's Ironbound, or Little Portugal, and the West Hudson towns along the Passaic River, Harrison and Kearny, have early and long tradition soccer.

Year-by-year

See also
Sports in Newark, New Jersey

References

Defunct soccer clubs in New Jersey
Eastern Professional Soccer League (1928–29) teams
American Soccer League (1933–1983) teams
Portuguese-American culture in New Jersey
Sports in Newark, New Jersey
1922 establishments in New Jersey
Association football clubs established in 1922
Diaspora soccer clubs in the United States